CTSN may refer to:

Clemson Tigers Sports Network
Crimson Tide Sports Network